Michael Pearce (1933 – 2022) was a British author of historical fiction and police procedurals, best known for his series of nineteen "Mamur Zapt" detective novels set in Egypt during the opening years of the twentieth century.  Covering a period from approximately 1908 through 1920, the Mamur Zapt novels feature a detective named Gareth Cadwallader Owen whose career and cases reflect the history of British colonialism in the Nile Valley, as well as the history of Egyptology, Coptic Christian and Muslim relations, European privileges via the Capitulations, and more.

Biography
Pearce was raised in Anglo-Egyptian Sudan. As an adult, he trained as a Russian interpreter during the Cold War, and subsequently became involved with Amnesty International.

His first novel, The Mamur Zapt and the Return of the Carpet, was published in 1988. That was the start of a "Mamur Zapt" series of mysteries.

He has also published a number of "A Dead Man in..." mysteries, set in the period preceding the First World War and featuring Sandor Seymour, an officer of Scotland Yard's Special Branch who is sent by the British Foreign Office to deal with various crimes involving members of the British diplomatic service.  These mysteries are notable for their attention to period details and settings.

Pearce's novel The Mamur Zapt and the Spoils of Egypt (1992) won the Crime Writers' Association's Last Laugh Award for funniest crime novel, and his Death of an Effendi (1999) was shortlisted for the Ellis Peters Award for best historical crime novel.

Bibliography
{| class="wikitable sortable"
|-
! # !! Title !! Year !! Series
|-
| 1 || The Mamur Zapt and the Return of the Carpet || 1988 || Mamur Zapt
|-
| 2 || The Mamur Zapt and the Night of the Dog || 1989 || Mamur Zapt
|-
| 3 || The Mamur Zapt and the Donkey-Vous || 1990 || Mamur Zapt
|-
| 4 || The Mamur Zapt and the Men Behind || 1991 || Mamur Zapt
|-
| 5 || The Mamur Zapt and the Girl in the Nile || 1992 || Mamur Zapt
|-
| 6 || The Mamur Zapt and the Spoils of Egypt || 1992 || Mamur Zapt
|-
| 7 || The Mamur Zapt and the Camel of Destruction || 1993 || Mamur Zapt
|-
| 8 || The Snake Catcher's Daughter || 1994 || Mamur Zapt
|-
| 9 || The Mingrelian Conspiracy || 1995 || Mamur Zapt
|-
| 10 || The Fig Tree Murder || 1997 || Mamur Zapt
|-
| 11 || Dmitri and the Milk-Drinkers || 1997 || Dmitri Kameron'''
|-
| 12 || The Last Cut || 1998 || Mamur Zapt|-
| 12a || "The Mamur Zapt and the Catherine Wheel" || 1998 || Short story, Past Poisons|-
| 13 || Death of an Effendi || 1999 || Mamur Zapt|-
| 14 || Dmitri and the One-Legged Lady || 1999 || Dmitri Kameron 
|-
| 15 || A Cold Touch of Ice || 2000 || Mamur Zapt|-
| 16 || The Face in the Cemetery || 2001 || Mamur Zapt|-
| 17 || A Dead Man in Trieste || 2004 || Seymour of Special Branch|-
| 18 || A Dead Man in Istanbul || 2005 || Seymour of Special Branch|-
| 19 || The Point in the Market || 2005 || Mamur Zapt|-
| 20 || A Dead Man in Athens || 2006 || Seymour of Special Branch|-
| 21 || A Dead Man in Tangier || 2007 || Seymour of Special Branch|-
| 22 || A Dead Man in Barcelona || 2008 || Seymour of Special Branch|-
| 23 || The Mark of the Pasha || 2008 || Mamur Zapt|-
| 24 || A Dead Man in Naples || 2009 || Seymour of Special Branch|-
| 25 || A Dead Man in Malta || 2010 || Seymour of Special Branch|-
| 26 || The Bride Box || 2013 || Mamur Zapt|-
| 27 ||  The Mouth of the Crocodile || 2014 || Mamur Zapt|-
| 28 ||  The Women of the Souk || 2016 || Mamur Zapt|}
(Note that some reprint editions of the Mamur Zapt'' series retitle the books by dropping the opening phrase "The Mamur Zapt and...".)

References

Living people
British mystery writers
Writers of historical mysteries
1933 births